is a Japanese composer and music producer. Most of his compositions are sung by the Japanese girl group Speed.

References

External links
  

1963 births
Japanese composers
Japanese lyricists
Japanese male composers
Japanese songwriters
Living people
Musicians from Tokyo